= Göingeflickorna =

- Origin: Boalt, Sweden
- Genres: schlager
- Years active: 1955-13 December 1975

Göingeflickorna was a girl vocal trio from Sweden, active between 1955 and 1975. It consisted of sisters Sonja Martinsson (1934–2013), Barbro Svensson (born 1941) and Agneta Gardelid (1945–2021) Their major breakthrough came in 1961 with the song Kära mor. When Barbro left in 1975, Sonja and Agneta continued appearing together.

== Svensktoppen songs ==
- Vår lyckodröm - 1962
- Där näckrosen blommar - 1963
- Säterjäntans söndag - 1965
- När Solen ler - 1974
- Balsalens drottning – 1980
